This is a list of records in the British Touring Car Championship since its establishment in 1958. Drivers who competed in the 2022 British Touring Car Championship season are highlighted in bold.

This page is accurate as of the conclusion of the 2022 season.

Driver Records

Total entries

Total number of race wins

Most wins in a season

Most wins per circuit

Total number of Drivers' championships

Manufacturer Records

Total number of race wins
As Round 10 of 2022

Total number of Constructors' championships

Total number of winning driver championships by car manufacturer

Constructor Championship finishes

References

External links
 BTCC.net - History

British Touring Car Championship